The 2014–15 EHF Challenge Cup was the 18th edition of the European Handball Federation's third-tier competition for men's handball clubs. It was held from 30 September 2014 to 24 May 2015.

Overview

Team allocation
The labels in the parentheses show how each team qualified for the place of its starting round:
TH: Title holders
CW: Cup winners
CR: Cup runners-up
2nd, 3rd, 4th, 5th, 6th, etc.: League position

Round and draw dates
All draws held at the European Handball Federation headquarters in Vienna, Austria.

Knockout stage

Round 3
Teams listed first played the first leg at home. Some teams agreed to play both matches in the same venue. Bolded teams qualified into last 16.

|}
Notes

a Both legs were hosted by Red Boys Differdange.
b Both legs were hosted by Warrington Wolves HC.
c Both legs were hosted by HB Dudelange.
d Both legs were hosted by Riihimäki Cocks.

e Both legs were hosted by Dobrudja.
f Both legs were hosted by HC Visé.
g Both legs were hosted by Benfica.
h Both legs were hosted by Odorheiu Secuiesc.

Last 16

Seedings

Matches
Teams listed first played the first leg at home. Some teams agreed to play both matches in the same venue. Bolded teams qualified into quarter finals.

|}
Notes

a Both legs were hosted by Ramat Hashron.
b Both legs were hosted by Odorheiu Secuiesc.
c Both legs were hosted by Benfica.

d Both legs were hosted by Stord.
e Both legs will be hosted by Riihimäki Cocks

Quarterfinals

The first legs were played on 14 and 15 March and the second legs were played on 21 and 22 April March.
Teams listed first played the first leg at home. Bolded teams qualified into semifinals.

|}
Notes

Semifinals

The first legs were played on 11 and 12 April and the second legs were played on 19 April 2015.
Teams listed first played the first leg at home. Bolded teams qualified into finals.

|}
Notes

Final

The first leg was played on 17 May 2015 and the second Leg was played on 24 May 2015.
Team listed first will play the first leg at home.

|}

See also
2014–15 EHF Champions League
2014–15 EHF Cup

References

External links
EHF Challenge Cup (official website)

Challenge Cup
Challenge Cup
EHF Challenge Cup